San Francisco is a neo-grotesque typeface made by Apple Inc. It was first released to developers on November 18, 2014. It is the first new typeface designed at Apple in nearly twenty years and has been inspired by Helvetica and DIN.

The macOS Catalina font Galvji is similar to the San Francisco variant SF Pro Text but has lower leading and bigger spacing.

Variants

Note: SF has the codename SFNS in macOS and SFUI in iOS, regardless of the official name.

Stylistic fonts exist, which are mainly present in the iOS 16 Lock Screen, Apple Cash, watchOS Watch Faces, and several promotional materials. These include chiseled, stenciled, semi-rounded, dotted, prisma, railed, and slab-serif versions.

Some variants have two optical sizes: "display" for large and "text" for small text. Compared to display, the letters in text have larger apertures and more generous letter-spacing. The operating system automatically chooses the display optical size for sizes of at least 20 points, and the text optical size otherwise. Variable grades were eventually added in newer versions.

SF Pro/SF UI
UI font for macOS, iOS, iPadOS, and tvOS. In 2017, a revised version, SF Pro was introduced, supporting an expanded list of weights, optical sizes, glyphs and languages. SF Pro Rounded (codename SFUIRounded) was introduced in 2018.
 SF Pro Text comes with 9 weights with their italics. Initially had only 6 weights when introduced.
 SF Pro Display comes with 9 weights with their italics.
 SF Pro Rounded comes with 9 weights. It has the same figure as the "display" version but with rounded corners.
These fonts, for use in different languages, can be found on the Apple website in their corresponding regions of use as variations of SF Pro:
 SF Pro AR is an Arabic font; SF Pro JP is a Japanese font. SF Pro KR is a Korean font, and SF Pro TH is a Thai font.
 SF Pro SC, SF Pro TC and SF Pro HK are Chinese fonts; they are labeled as the PingFang family.

SF Pro is a variable font that also has variable widths in conjunction with weights, optical sizes, and grades. One of them is a print-optimized variant, SF Hello exists, which is restricted to Apple employees and permitted contractors and vendors, and is therefore unavailable for public use. This results in three fonts derived from SF Pro as shown below;

SF Condensed
A condensed variant of SF Pro.
SF Condensed Text has 6 weights.
 SF Condensed Display has 9 weights.
Variants are internally named SF Cash, SF Shields, and SF Condensed Photos, but those are all offshoots from the same font.

SF Compressed
A compressed variant of SF Pro. DIfferent from SF Condensed, vertical edges are fully straight, and its kerning is much closer.

SF Expanded
Internally called SF Wide, it is an expanded variant of SF Pro.

SF Compact
Initial font introduced with the Apple Watch and watchOS, but was later rebranded as SF Compact with the introduction of SF UI at WWDC 2015. Different from SF Pro, its characters' round curves are flatter, allowing the letters to be laid out with more space between them, thereby making the text more legible at small sizes, which Apple Watch small screen demands. SP Compact Rounded was introduced in 2016.
 SF Compact Text comes with 9 weights with their italics. Initially had only 6 weights when introduced.
 SF Compact Display comes with 9 weights with their italics.
 SF Compact Rounded comes with 9 weights. It has the same figure as the "display" version but with rounded corners.

SF Mono
A monospaced variant. UI font for the Terminal, Console, and Xcode applications. It was introduced at WWDC 2016.
 SF Mono comes with 6 weights with their italics.

SF Camera
Introduced on September 10, 2019 at Apple's keynote; Phil Schiller mentioned it while summarizing the camera updates on iPhone 11 Pro. Different from SF Pro, this variant has a boxier design which gives an industrial and professional look. Its figure and tracking are similar to SF Compact Text.

Other fonts

SF Serif (New York)
A serif variant. It was introduced as SF Serif (codename Serif UI) at WWDC 2018 as the UI font for the redesigned Apple Books app for IOS 12. It was officially released under the name New York on the Apple Developer site on June 3, 2019.
New York Small comes with 6 weights with their italics.
 New York Medium comes with 6 weights with their italics.
 New York Large comes with 6 weights with their italics.
New York Extra Large comes with 6 weights with their italics.
The font includes OpenType features for lining and old-style figures in both proportional and tabular widths. Despite Apple having a font with the same name with the bitmap format for the original Macintosh (and later converted to TrueType format), it is unrelated to this design.

Variable Fonts
Apple introduced the OpenType Font Variations feature of their SF fonts in WWDC20. It is included as a TrueType Font in the installer file on the Developer website. On WWDC22, variable width option is introduced to the font family. 

 SF Pro feature variable weights, variable widths, and variable optical sizes of between "text" and "display".
 SF Pro Italic, and SF Compact feature variable weights and variable optical sizes of between "text" and "display".
 SF Compact Italic features variable weights but has "text" optical size only.
 New York and New York Italic feature variable weights and variable optical sizes between "small" and "extra large".

SF Symbols
SF Symbols refers to symbols and icons used in the Apple operating systems. To fit Apple's objectives of core functionality and "easy to use"-ness, these symbols are designed using Apple's visual language and unified design elements. They also include the squircle instead of standard rounded corners for a more comfortable look, similar to what Apple has used in their other designs. By using unified symbols, users can experience the easiness and intuitiveness when interacting between Apple's devices, services, and apps.

Apple's symbols are included as glyphs in the font file of SF Pro, SF Pro Rounded, SF Compact, and SF Compact Rounded (also in their variable font file). Each symbol is available in 3 sizes. These symbols change their thickness and negative space according to chosen weight, they even utilized with the Opentype Variation feature. Using the SF Symbols app can access more features such as refined alignment, multicolor, and localization of symbols.  The symbol properties are not unified across variants. Different Unicode arrangement for some symbols result in different symbols when switching between variants, and some symbols have noticeably fewer details in some variants.version 16.0d18e1 

These symbols are available for developers to use in their apps on Apple platforms only. Developers are allowed to customize it to desired styles and colors, but certain symbols may not be modified and may only be used to refer to its respective Apple services or devices as listed in the license description.

Usage
Since its introduction, San Francisco has gradually replaced most of Apple's other typefaces on their software and hardware products and for overall branding and has replaced Lucida Grande and Helvetica Neue as the system typeface of macOS and iOS since OS X El Capitan and iOS 9. Apple uses it on its website and for its product wordmarks, where it replaced Myriad Pro. It is also used on Magic Keyboard and on the keyboard of the 2015 MacBook and on the 2016 MacBook Pro, replacing VAG Rounded. It is also used as Apple's corporate typeface.

Apple restricts the usage of the typeface by others. It is licensed to registered third-party developers only for the design and development of applications for Apple's platforms. Only SF Pro, SF Compact, SF Mono, SF Arabic, and New York variants are available for download on Developer website and they are the only SF variants allowed to be used by developers.

The San Francisco Chronicle described the font as having nothing to do with the city and just being "Helvetica on a low-carb diet".

See also
 Cantarell
 IBM Plex
 Roboto
 Noto
 Segoe
 Product Sans

References

External links
 San Francisco on Apple's developer website

Apple Inc. typefaces
Sans-serif typefaces
Monospaced typefaces
Typefaces with optical sizes
Computer-related introductions in 2014
Typefaces and fonts introduced in 2014
Cyrillic typefaces
Display typefaces
Greek typefaces
Latin-script typefaces